Thomas Hill (born ca. 1528) was an English astrologer, writer and translator who most probably also wrote as Didymus Mountain.

Works
He was the author of the first popular book in English about gardening — The profitable arte of gardening — which was first published in 1563 under the title A most briefe and pleasaunte treatyse, teachynge how to dresse, sowe, and set a garden. 
He went on to write other popular works, such as The Gardener's Labyrinth (1577). This was originally published under the name of Didymus Mountain, now generally attributed to Thomas Hill. 
In 1988, the Oxford University Press produced a paperback reprint of this book under the name Thomas Hill. 
Hill also published works on arithmetic, astrology, the interpretation of dreams and physiognomy.

References

Sources

1520s births
English garden writers
16th-century English writers
16th-century male writers
16th-century English historians
Historians of England
16th-century English translators
English astrologers
16th-century astrologers
Year of death missing
16th-century English mathematicians